Hennstedt is a municipality in the district of Dithmarschen, in Schleswig-Holstein, Germany. It is situated approximately 10 km northeast of Heide. Hennstedt is the seat of the Amt Kirchspielslandgemeinde ("collective municipality") Eider.

People 
 Wilhelm Wieben (1935-2019), German journalist

References

Municipalities in Schleswig-Holstein
Dithmarschen